St. Paul Street and Calvert Street are a one-way pair of streets in Downtown Baltimore and areas north. The streets, which are part of Maryland Route 2, are two of Baltimore's best-known streets in the downtown area.

St. Paul Street

St. Paul Street begins off Charles Street just south of Coldspring Lane near Loyola College (now renamed Loyola University Maryland) From this point on, the street runs directly parallel to North Charles Street, exactly one block east of Charles Street. It carries Maryland Route 139 in the southbound direction until intersecting North Avenue (formerly Boundary Avenue with northern city limits of 1818-1888) (U.S. Route 1), where MD 139 ends.

St. Paul Street is two ways until the intersection with 31st Street. Northbound traffic is relegated to a single northbound lane, separated by median, and with metered parallel parking.

St. Paul Street is exit 4 off the Jones Falls Expressway (I-83). Approaching the downtown area moving south between East Centre and Lexington Streets, St. Paul Street is split into two parallel, nearby streets, also being identified as St. Paul Place in this area. The wider eastern thoroughfare was the former narrow alley-like Courtland Street, once flanked by rows of small brick and stone townhouses. While the more westward of the two sides of St. Paul Street/Place intersects with all east-west streets within these blocks, the eastward opposite wider side passes under the Orleans Street Viaduct (US 40). The area between the two St. Paul streets, landscaped into terraced gardens and parks with fountains are known as Preston Gardens, replaced a group of 1820s Georgian, Federal and Greek Revival styled architecture townhouses which had become shabby by the early 20th century along Courtland Street and the original parallel St. Paul Street  and the five square blocks north to south were razed in 1919 as the city's first "urban renewal" project and was landscaped by Thomas Hastings. 

Preston Gardens were named for James H. Preston, who was mayor of the City of Baltimore (1911-1919, and a Speaker in 1894 of the Maryland House of Delegates of which he served 1890-1894.

Notable landmarks
Penn Station
Mercy Hospital (now Mercy Medical Center), originally located on parallel eastward Calvert Street at East Saratoga Street since 1870s.

Calvert Street

As St. Paul Street is mostly one-way southbound, Calvert Street, which is directly east of St. Paul, is open to northbound traffic.  North Calvert Street is a name of a portion of the street north of its intersection with East Baltimore Street.  South Calvert Street is a name for the downtown portion running further south and alongside the Inner Harbor waterfront to the east.

Calvert Street begins at Pratt Street near the Inner Harbor and continues through the downtown area and various north Baltimore neighborhoods before terminating in the Guilford neighborhood. of northern Baltimore.

At its railroad and Jones Falls stream crossing near I-83, Calvert Street once had an arch-style steel/iron bridge with lions sculptures at each end, though not as interesting looking as the one on nearby Charles Street or Howard Street running parallel to the west. The present crossing on Calvert Street is ordinary-looking poured concrete construction.

Notable landmarks
 Clarence M. Mitchell, Jr. Courthouse of 1896-1900 (Baltimore City Circuit Courthouse and its opposite Courthouse East (former U.S. Courthouse and Post Office), from 1930-32) 
 Battle Monument, 1815-1822, from the Battle of Baltimore of September 1814 in the War of 1812
 Baltimore Sun newspaper building, 1950
 Union Memorial Hospital

Light Street
After passing East Baltimore Street, St. Paul Street changes its name to Light Street. Light Street becomes a large, two-way street with center divider after passing East Pratt Street (which runs along the north shore of the Inner Harbor and municipal piers 1 to 6),  the point where South Calvert Street begins for northbound traffic. Light Street continues through Francis Scott Key Highway (Key Highway), passing through the Federal Hill and old South Baltimore commercial district and tightly packed rowhouse neighborhoods and the Cross Street Market, one of Baltimore's formerly twelve municipal narkethouses (now down to six) until its southern terminus at Wells Street, just east of parallel South Hanover Street (Maryland Route 2), above the north shore of the Middle Branch of the Patapsco River and Baltimore Harbor.
The street ends by the newly planned Port Covington redevelopment. project, for the former site of War of 1812 supporting redoubt battery of Fort Covington from the Battle of Baltimore and later railyards with shipping piers for the old Western Maryland Railway from the late 1890s to early 1980s.

Though quite short in length, Light Street is well known in the area, forming the western boundary of the Inner Harbor tourist area. The formerly narrow cobble-stoned waterfront street clogged with horses and wagons and later early trucks was the site of the western shore piers for East Coast/Chesapeake Bay passenger steamboats such as the Old Bay Line and others in the 19th and early 20th centuries. Today, the Harborplace shopping pavilions (1980), the glass walled Baltimore Visitors Center (2010) are located here along with the Maryland Science Center, founded 1797 was relocated here on the Light Street waterfront in 1976, and the former McCormick & Company offices and manufacturing plant for spices. flavorings and seasonings between 1889/ rebuilt 1922 to 1989 was located facing Light Street at Conway Street, opposite the Inner Harbor.

Light Street is named for Darby Lux I, an early Baltimore merchant who had a house on the street.

References

External links
Metal Arch Bridges in Maryland, Describes the history of the Calvert Street Bridge

Downtown Baltimore
Streets in Baltimore